The 1970 United States House of Representatives elections in South Carolina were held on November 3, 1970 to select six Representatives for two-year terms from the state of South Carolina.  The primary elections were held on June 9 and the runoff elections were held two weeks later on June 23.  All five incumbents who ran were re-elected and the open seat in the 2nd district was retained by the Republicans.  The composition of the state delegation remained five Democrats and one Republican.

1st congressional district
Incumbent Democratic Congressman L. Mendel Rivers of the 1st congressional district, in office since 1941, was unopposed in his bid for re-election.

General election results

|-
| 
| colspan=5 |Democratic hold
|-

2nd congressional district
Incumbent Republican Congressman Albert Watson of the 2nd congressional district, in office since 1963, chose to run for Governor instead of re-election.  Floyd Spence, a Republican state senator who had unsuccessfully run for the seat in the 1962 elections, defeated Democratic challenger Heyward McDonald.

General election results

|-
| 
| colspan=5 |Republican hold
|-

3rd congressional district
Incumbent Democratic Congressman William Jennings Bryan Dorn of the 3rd congressional district, in office since 1951, defeated Republican challenger Grady Ballard.

General election results

|-
| 
| colspan=5 |Democratic hold
|-

4th congressional district
Incumbent Democratic Congressman James R. Mann of the 4th congressional district, in office since 1969, was unopposed in his bid for re-election.

General election results

|-
| 
| colspan=5 |Democratic hold
|-

5th congressional district
Incumbent Democratic Congressman Thomas S. Gettys of the 5th congressional district, in office since 1964, defeated Republican challenger B. Leonard Phillips.

General election results

|-
| 
| colspan=5 |Democratic hold
|-

6th congressional district
Incumbent Democratic Congressman John L. McMillan of the 6th congressional district, in office since 1939, won the Democratic primary and defeated Republican Edward B. Baskin in the general election.

Democratic primary

General election results

|-
| 
| colspan=5 |Democratic hold
|-

See also
United States House elections, 1970
South Carolina gubernatorial election, 1970
South Carolina's congressional districts

References

South Carolina
United States House of Representatives
1970